Ban Bo Sane is a village in Sainyabuli Province, Laos. It is located not far from the border with Thailand. To the northwest is the peak of Phu Soi Dao.

References

Populated places in Sainyabuli Province